Serebryano-Prudsky District is an administrative and municipal district (raion), one of the thirty-six in Moscow Oblast, Russia. It is located in the south of the oblast. Its administrative center is the urban locality (a work settlement) of Serebryanye Prudy. Population: 25,843 (2010 Census);  The population of Serebryanye Prudy accounts for 37.6% of the district's total population.

References

Notes

Sources

Districts of Moscow Oblast